George Walker (1763 – August 19, 1819) was a U.S. Senator from Kentucky.

Born in Culpeper County, Virginia, Walker attended the common schools and served in the American Revolutionary War. He moved to Jessamine County, Kentucky in 1794 and studied law. He was admitted to the bar and commenced practice in Nicholasville, Kentucky in 1799. He served as a commissioner of the Kentucky River Company in 1801.

Walker was a member of the Kentucky State Senate from 1810 to 1814. He was then appointed to the United States Senate to fill the vacancy caused by the resignation of George M. Bibb, and served from August 30, 1814 to February 2, 1815 when a successor was elected. He died in Nicholasville in 1819, and was interred on his estate near there.

George Walker was the brother of David Walker and John Walker and the great uncle of James David Walker. He was also the uncle of two governors of Florida, Richard Keith Call and David Shelby Walker. Another nephew John George Walker served as a general in the Confederate Army during the Civil War.

Sources

1763 births
1819 deaths
Kentucky lawyers
Kentucky state senators
United States senators from Kentucky
People from Culpeper County, Virginia
Democratic-Republican Party United States senators
Kentucky Democratic-Republicans
19th-century American lawyers